Hilary Bell (20 August 1965 – 2010) was a pioneer of British reality television whose commissions for Channel 4 include Faking It and Wife Swap.

Early life and education
Hilary Bell was born in Fareham, Hampshire.  She was educated at Rookesbury Park School, at Petworth and at Portsmouth High School for Girls.  She then attended Trinity College, Cambridge, reading law.

Career
Bell worked as a researcher at the BBC and was involved in broadcast journalism such as the undercover investigation into the Hoover free flights promotion in 1992. She went on to work with Peter Dale on the BAFTA-nominated series The System in 1996, contributing greatly to the success of the series. Bell also worked as a director on Vets in Practice.

In 1999, she was appointed as deputy commissioning editor for documentaries by Channel 4. In this position and then as commissioning editor, she worked with series such as Wife Swap, Faking It and Cutting Edge and single programmes such as the 2001 Brian's Story.

References

External links

1965 births
2010 deaths
Alumni of Trinity College, Cambridge
People educated at Portsmouth High School (Southsea)
BBC television producers